Lynn Afendoulis (born November 3, 1958) is an American politician from the state of Michigan. A Republican, she served as a member of Michigan House of Representatives from the 73rd district from 2019 to 2021.

Early life and education 
Afendoulis was born in Grand Rapids, Michigan, the daughter of a restaurant owner and teacher. Afendoulis is of Greek ancestry: her grandparents are ethnic Greek immigrants from Greece and Turkey.

Afendoulis attended Miami University before earning a Bachelor of Arts in journalism from Michigan State University.

Career

Media career 
In 1981, Afendoulis started her career as a reporter for The Grand Rapids Press until 1987. In 1987, Afendoulis became a reporter for The Tampa Tribune until 1989. In 1989, Afendoulis became a Communications/Public Relations Manager for the Bay Plaza Companies in St. Petersburg, Florida. In 1995, Afendoulis was a consultant for The Greystone Group. Since 2003, Afendoulis was a Director of Corporate Communications and Community Relations for Universal Forest Products.

Political career 
In August 2018, Afendoulis won the primary election for Michigan House of Representatives for District 73. Incumbent Chris Afendoulis, who is her cousin, had run for the Michigan Senate. On November 6, 2018, Afendoulis won the election against Bill Saxton and became a member of the Michigan House of Representatives for District 73. On December 18, 2018, Afendoulis was officially sworn in by House Clerk Gary Randall.

In June 2020 following the George Floyd protests in Grand Rapids, she proposed a bill to punish those who participate in riots with terrorism charges of up to a 20-year felony sentence in, with Afendoulis stating "We want prosecutors to be able to charge them as terrorists. As social terrorists".

She lost the August 4 primary election to Peter Meijer.

Personal life 
Afendoulis has two children. Afendoulis resides in Grand Rapids Charter Township, Michigan.

See also 
 2018 Michigan House of Representatives election

References

External links 
 Lynn Afendoulis at gophouse.org
 Lynn Afendoulis at ballotpedia.org

21st-century American politicians
21st-century American women politicians
Living people
1958 births
Republican Party members of the Michigan House of Representatives
Miami University alumni
Michigan State University alumni
Women state legislators in Michigan
Politicians from Grand Rapids, Michigan
American people of Greek descent